The Russian occupation of Gotland took place in April and May 1808, during the Finnish War between Sweden and Russia.

History 
Russia had invaded Finland on 21 February 1808. An invasion force of nine Russian merchant ships left Liepāja and landed 22 April, after losing its course due to fog, at Slesviken in Grötlingbo on south Gotland with 1,800 men and six artillery guns under the command of Admiral Nikolai Andreevich Bodisko. After some initial confusion, beacons raised an invasion alarm which eventually reached the county governor, the retired marine officer Erik af Klint. Af Klint started organizing an armed force in Gotland following orders from Stockholm.

However, Gotland had no troops ready at the time of the invasion. Instead af Klint had to raise a peasant levy. Af Klint judged the military situation unfavorable and decided to surrender without a fight. On 23 April the surrender took place, without documents, at the Sandäskes inn in Sanda. The next day the Russian force marched into Visby and found quarters. Bodisko proclaimed himself governor of Gotland, but Swedish officials -- except for af Klint -- were allowed to remain.

The two Swedish ships of the line  and Manligheten were sent from Karlskrona and blockaded the harbor of Slite beginning 12 May, hampering the possibility of Russian reinforcements. On board were soldiers from Småland commanded by the lieutenant-colonel of the Jönköping Regiment,  (1757–1834).

When news reached Visby that Swedish forces were on Gotland, the Russians capitulated. The Swedish force of over two thousand had by this time marched to Tule in Ganthem from Sandviken in Gammelgarn, where the Swedish fleet squadrons had arrived on 14 May. The Russians evacuated Visby on 17 May and left Gotland via Slite the next day.

Losses 
The only loss associated with the Russian occupation was boatsman Carl Fredrik Lindgren (1777–1808), who fell to his death from the rigging of the flagship, Konung Gustav IV Adolph, at Sandviken.

Aftermath 
Nikolai Bodisko was court-martialed and lost his commission (which he later regained).

In Sweden, the occupation led to the organization of national conscription, and Gotland National Conscription was the first unit 1811.

See also 
 Gotland National Conscription

Notes, citations and sources

Notes

Citations

Sources
 

 Ingemund Hägg: Graven på Sysneudd, 2013
 Gunnar Unger: Illustrerad svensk sjökrigshistoria: afsedd för undervisningen vid k. sjökrigsskolan. Del 1, omfattande tiden intill 1680, Bonniers, Stockholm 1909, pp 228-32
 Mika Koskelainen: I spåren efter den ryska invasionen av Gotland 1808 på Sveriges Radios webbplats 22 mars 2008, viewed 2014-08-28

1808 in Sweden
Finnish War
Conflicts in 1808
Gotland
Russian military occupations